Dora Márquez, commonly known as Dora the Explorer, is the title character and protagonist of the American children's animated television series and multimedia franchise of the same name. She is portrayed as a heroic Latina girl who embarks on countless adventures in order to find something or help somebody in need.

Depiction
Dora was originally created to help teach Spanish in grade schools. As time went on, she was depicted on live shows in theatres, stadiums, and halls, originally as a bunny that lived in the woods, but later in production as a pan-Latina (any ambiguous race of Latina) girl. As a child 7-8 years old in Dora the Explorer (2000), she is portrayed as a multilingual educator who likes sports, family, exploring the world, and her friends Boots, Backpack, Map, Isa, Benny and Tico. As a teenager 10 years old in Dora and Friends: Into the City! (2014), she is portrayed as a compassionate leader and role model, who has multiple dynamic peer relationships. In Dora and the Lost City of Gold (2019), she is a high school teen, 16 years old, portrayed as a naïve fish-out-of-water weirdo to the people around her. Her parents need to remind her that she is an explorer (a positive designation), not a treasure hunter (a negative designation). In this adaptation, she is described as a "Latino superhero" by executive producer and actor Eugenio Derbez.

References

Dora the Explorer
Animated characters introduced in 2000
Television characters introduced in 2000
Animated human characters
Female characters in animated series
Fictional characters who break the fourth wall
Fictional explorers
Fictional Hispanic and Latino American people
Child characters in animated television series